Triangle is a 2009 psychological horror film written and directed by Christopher Smith and starring Melissa George and Michael Dorman. The film was released in the United Kingdom on 16 October 2009. George portrays a single mother who goes on a boating trip with several friends. When they are forced to abandon their ship, they board a derelict ocean liner, where they become convinced that someone is stalking them.

Plot 
Jess prepares to take Tommy, her autistic son, on a boat trip with her friend Greg and hears the doorbell ring, but no one is there. Jess drives to a Florida harbor without Tommy, explaining that he is at his special needs school, and boards Greg's boat with his deckhand Victor, his married friends Sally and Downey, and Sally's friend Heather. At sea, a storm approaches, and while Greg radios the Coast Guard, he picks up a distress signal from a woman frantically pleading help. The woman says that someone is killing everyone but is cut off before she can provide her location. The storm capsizes the boat and Heather is swept away by the ocean. The others climb onto the overturned boat when the storm clears.

The survivors board an ocean liner as it passes. It appears to be deserted despite the fact that they saw the silhouette of a person on the bridge deliberately ignoring their cries for help, and there is fresh food in the dining room. Jess experiences a sense of déjà vu as they explore the ship. They find Jess's keys near a display case for Aeolus, the ship's namesake. Jess spots someone watching them and Victor gives chase. She and Greg find "Go To Theater" written in blood on a mirror, but Greg insists it's just the crew playing a prank. Jess returns to the dining room, where the food is now rotting. Victor, covered in blood, tries to kill Jess but she fights him off.

She hears gunfire and follows it to a theater, where Greg lies dead of a gunshot. Sally and Downey say that Greg told them Jess shot him. A masked shooter kills them and chases Jess; she disarms the shooter, who tells her "You have to kill them; it's the only way to get home" before falling overboard.

She hears yelling and sees a second set of Jess and the others arrive on Greg's capsized boat and spot her as the earlier unseen figure. The second set of people board the boat. Jess is spotted when she drops her keys near the display case, and she attempts to warn Victor 2 when he chases her, only to accidentally impale his head on a wall hook. She finds dozens of the shooter's outfits, several shotguns, her own locket, and a note saying to kill them all when they board, written in her own handwriting. She takes a shotgun, intending to "change the pattern," but the shooter, a third Jess repeating the loop, kills Greg and Downey 2 before mortally wounding Sally 2.

The first Jess chases Sally 2, who sends the distress signal heard on Greg's boat. Jess catches up to her on a deck filled with dozens of Sally corpses, and Sally succumbs to her wound as, below them, the second Jess kills the shooter Jess. The overturned boat returns again with another copy of Jess and the others, and Jess realizes the loop restarts once everyone is killed. Desperate to stop the loop, Jess sets everything from the first loop into motion, and cloaks her face using a burlap bag as a makeshift mask. After she is disarmed during the fight on the front deck, she urges her counterpart to kill everyone, and the second Jess knocks the original overboard.

She awakens washed ashore and discovers that it is the same morning. She returns home and watches from outside her house as her original morning self yells abusively at Tommy out of anger toward his autism. Promising to change, she distracts her counterpart with the doorbell, then kills her, puts the bagged body in the car trunk, and leaves with Tommy. A seagull hits their windshield and dies, but when she picks it up and disposes of it, she sees a pile of dead seagulls. Realizing that she is still trapped in the loop, Jess hurriedly drives away, but crashes into a truck. Tommy is killed on impact, and the double of Jess from the trunk is seen dead at the scene. In the aftermath, the real Jess stands watching the accident scene. A taxi driver approaches and she accepts a ride to the harbour. After promising to return, she joins the others on Greg's boat, starting the loop again.

Cast

Production 
Triangle was a British-Australian co-production written and directed by Christopher Smith. The UK Film Council awarded £1.6 million ($2.8 million) of public money from the National Lottery fund towards the development, production and distribution of the movie.

The film was shot on sets and on location in Queensland, Australia. Smith insisted on having a set constructed that depicted the exterior of a cruise liner, in order to minimize shooting in front of green screens.

The movie was based in part on the story of Sisyphus, the Greek mythological figure cursed to repeatedly push a boulder up a hill without ever successfully reaching the top. Smith also was inspired by Dead of Night and Memento. He wanted to make a circular movie that explored déjà vu, while avoiding reusing elements of Jacob's Ladder.

Release 
Triangle premiered at the London FrightFest Film Festival on 27 August 2009. It was released theatrically in the UK on 16 October 2009, in Belgium on 30 December 2009, and in the Netherlands on 21 January 2010.

The movie grossed $894,985 in the UK, and $1,303,598 total worldwide. It did not receive a theatrical release in the US.

Home media 
Icon Home Entertainment released Triangle on DVD and Blu-ray in the UK on 1 March 2010, with features including a commentary track by director Smith. First Look Studios distributed the film on DVD and Blu-ray in the US, releasing it on 2 February 2010. The American discs do not include the commentary track, nor some of the other extras on the British releases.

Reception 
Rotten Tomatoes, a review aggregator, reports an approval rating of 80% based on 40 reviews, with an average rating of 6.53/10. The site's critics' consensus reads: "Triangle sails into some strange waters, but this intelligent, well-acted horror outing anchors its idiosyncrasies in a satisfyingly scary story."

Empire gave the film a 4/5 stars rating and called it a "satisfying mind-twister, with an unexpectedly poignant pay-off". Variety said that Triangle only makes some kind of sense on its own fantastic level. Time Out London reviewer Nigel Floyd praised George's "fearless, credible performance" that "grounds the madness in a moving emotional reality". The Guardian critic, Philip French compared it to a "Möbius strip" in which the viewer "wonders how Smith will keep things going" and added the viewer will "leave his picture suitably shaken". Fellow Guardian critic Peter Bradshaw wrote that Triangle is a "smart, interestingly constructed scary movie", complimenting Smith for "creating some real shivers".

Entertainment.ie's Mike Sheridan was less impressed. Although he praised George's acting, he wrote that her performance "can't shield the fact that this still an exceptionally non-scary horror, that will have you scratching your head more than jumping out of your seat", ultimately rating it 2/5 stars. The Scotsman called it "a trickily plotted and slickly made effort that nevertheless can't quite make its premise fly in gripping enough fashion".

See also 
 List of films featuring time loops

References

External links
 
 

2009 films
2009 horror films
2009 psychological thriller films
2000s horror thriller films
2000s mystery thriller films
2000s psychological horror films
Australian horror thriller films
Australian mystery thriller films
British horror thriller films
British mystery thriller films
British psychological horror films
British psychological thriller films
2000s English-language films
Films about autism
Films about child death
Films about dysfunctional families
Films about time travel
Films directed by Christopher Smith
Films set in the Bermuda Triangle
Films set in Florida
Films set on ships
Films shot on the Gold Coast, Queensland
Icon Productions films
Mystery horror films
Time loop films
2000s British films